Zerrin is a Turkish feminine given name. Notable people with the name include: 
 Zerrin Temiz musician, vocalist, music producer, singer of "Hislerim" song

 Zerrin Bakır (born 1981), Turkish football coach and former football player
 Zerrin Bölükbaşı, Turkish sculptor
 Zerrin Güngör, Turkish civil servant, President of the Council of State of Turkey
 Zerrin Tekindor, Turkish actress
 Zerrin Özer, Turkish pop singer

See also 
 Prizren, a city in Kosovo sometimes referred to by this name

Turkish feminine given names